The Agile-class minesweepers are a class of US-built ocean-going minesweepers. 58 ships were built for the United States Navy, 35 ships were built for the allied NATO navies of Belgium, France, Italy, the Netherlands, Norway and Portugal. 13 ships were later transferred to Belgium, Spain, Taiwan, the Philippines and Uruguay.

There is some confusion on how to name this class. Sometimes four ships are a Dash-class subclass, although all ships are of the same design.

Design
As a result of experiences during the Korean War, the United States Navy undertook a large scale construction of a new series of minesweepers. In contrast to the steel-hulled minesweepers built before, the Agile-class minesweepers were built mostly of wood with bronze and stainless steel fittings and engines to minimize their magnetic signature. The ships were equipped with the UQS-1 mine-locating sonar and were capable of sweeping moored, bottom contact, magnetic and acoustic mines.

Modernization
Although it was planned to modernize all U.S. Navy ship of this class, only 19 ships were modernized starting with Fiscal Year 1968. The modernization cost between 700,000 and 1,500,000 $ per ship and should enable them to operate for another ten years. The ships received new aluminum block Waukesha diesel engines and the superstructure was enlarged aft. The UQS-1 sonar was replaced with SQQ-14. Two PAP-104 cable-guided undersea tools were added. Also, two 40 hp zodiacs were carried for the purpose of mooring the new sonar reflectors. Also, a team of mine clearance divers was added. Additional space on the foc'sle was needed for installation of the SQQ-14 cabling so the 40mm Bofors bow gun was replaced with a mount for a twin 20 mm Mk 68 gun.

As of 2015, the four ships transferred to Taiwan are still in service.

Construction and disposition

References

External links

FAS - MSO-422 class
GlobalSecurity - MSO-422 class

 

 
Mine warfare vessel classes